The 1996 Arkansas State Indians football team represented Arkansas State University as an independent during the 1996 NCAA Division I-A football season. Led by John Bobo in his fourth and final season as head coach, the Indians compiled a record of 4–7.

Schedule

Roster

References

Arkansas State
Arkansas State Red Wolves football seasons
Arkansas State Indians football